Thiratoscirtus elgonensis is a species of jumping spider in the genus Thiratoscirtus that lives in Kenya. It was first described in 2016.

References

Endemic fauna of Kenya
Salticidae
Spiders of Africa
Spiders described in 2016
Fauna of Kenya